Richard Francis Cash (born July 1, 1945) is a former American football defensive lineman in the National Football League (NFL). He was a 10th round selection (260th overall pick) in the 1968 NFL Draft out of Northeast Missouri State University by the Green Bay Packers. Cash would play for the Atlanta Falcons (1968), the Los Angeles Rams (1969–1970), and the New England Patriots (1972–1973).

College career
Cash started collegiate career at the University of Missouri and switched to Northeast Missouri where he played tight end and offensive tackle.

Professional career

Green Bay Packers
Cash was a 10th round draft choice of Green Bay in 1968 but failed to make the team. He was cut in September 1968.

Atlanta Falcons
Atlanta signed him off the waiver wire and he played both tackle and defensive end for Falcons in 1968. He ended the season with six tackles (one for a loss).

Los Angeles Rams
Cash was traded to Los Angeles prior to the 1969 season. He played sparingly, making two tackles.  Injuries curtailed his activity in both the 1970 and 1971 seasons. In 1970, he made six tackles (one for a loss). In 1971, he was on injured reserve.

New England Patriots
Cash went to the Patriots in 1972 (along with the Rams' No. 1 draft choice in the 1973 NFL Draft) in the Fred Dryer trade. He was the Patriots special teams captain in 1972 along with playing right defensive end and right defensive tackle. He ended the season with 95 tackles and no sacks, two passes defensed and a blocked kick. In 1973, he made 92 tackles and sacked the quarterback three times. He played in 28 straight regular season games after joining the Patriots prior to the 1972 season, starting in the last 27.

World Football League
Rick also played a year in the World Football League for the Philadelphia Bell and the San Antonio Wings.

References

1945 births
Living people
Players of American football from St. Louis
American football defensive ends
American football defensive tackles
Truman Bulldogs football players
Atlanta Falcons players
Los Angeles Rams players
New England Patriots players
Missouri Tigers football players
Philadelphia Bell players
San Antonio Wings players